The following outline is provided as an overview of and topical guide to Jupiter:

Jupiter – fifth planet from the Sun and the largest in the Solar System. It is a giant planet with a mass one-thousandth that of the Sun, but two and a half times that of all the other planets in the Solar System combined. Jupiter is a gas giant, along with Saturn, with the other two giant planets, Uranus and Neptune, being ice giants. Jupiter was known to astronomers of ancient times. The Romans named it after their god Jupiter. When viewed from Earth, Jupiter can reach an apparent magnitude of −2.94, bright enough for its reflected light to cast shadows, and making it on average the third-brightest object in the night sky after the Moon and Venus.

Contents 
 Astronomical object
 Gravitationally rounded object
 Planet
 Giant planet
 Gas giant
 Planet of the Solar System
 Outer planet
 Superior planet

Location of Jupiter 

 Milky Way Galaxy – barred spiral galaxy
 Orion Arm – a spiral arm of the Milky Way
 Solar System – the Sun and the objects that orbit it, including 8 planets, the 5th planet from the sun being Jupiter
 Orbit of Jupiter

Features of Jupiter 

 Magnetosphere of Jupiter
 Atmosphere of Jupiter
 Great Red Spot
 Rings of Jupiter
 Kirkwood gap

Natural satellites of Jupiter 

 Moons of Jupiter
 Jupiter Trojan
 Comet Shoemaker–Levy 9

Inner Moons of Jupiter 

 Metis
 Adrastea
 Amalthea
 Thebe

Galilean moons of Jupiter 

 Galilean moons

Io 

Io
 Volcanism on Io
 Exploration of Io
 Regions on Io
 Volcanic features on Io
 Mountains on Io
 Quadrangles on Io

Europa 

Europa
 Geological features on Europa
 Craters on Europa
 Lineae on Europa
 Quadrangles on Europa

Ganymede 

Ganymede
 List of geological features on Ganymede
 List of craters on Ganymede
 List of quadrangles on Ganymede

Callisto 

Callisto
 List of geological features on Callisto
 List of craters on Callisto
 Valhalla

Irregular prograde moons of Jupiter 

Themisto
Carpo
Valetudo

Himalia group of moons of Jupiter 

Himalia group
 Leda
 Himalia
 Ersa
 Pandia
 Lysithea
 Elara
 Dia

Ananke group of moons of Jupiter 

Ananke group
 S/2003 J 12
 Euporie
 Eupheme
 Jupiter LV 
 Jupiter LII
 Thelxinoe
 Euanthe
 Helike
 Orthosie
 Jupiter LXVIII
 Jupiter LIV 
 Jupiter LXIV
 Iocaste
 S/2003 J 16
 Praxidike
 Harpalyke
 Mneme
 Hermippe
 Thyone
 Jupiter LXX
 Ananke

Carme group of moons of Jupiter 

Carme group
 Jupiter LXXII
 Herse
 Aitne
 Kale
 Taygete
 Jupiter LXI
 Chaldene
 S/2003 J 10
 Erinome
 Kallichore
 Jupiter LXVI
 Jupiter LXIX
 Kalyke
 Carme
 Jupiter LXIII
 Pasithee
 Jupiter LI
 Eukelade
 Arche
 Isonoe
 S/2003 J 9
 Eirene

Pasiphae group of moons of Jupiter 
Pasiphae group
 Jupiter LXVII
 Philophrosyne
 S/2003 J 23
 Aoede
 Callirrhoe
 Eurydome
 Kore
 Cyllene
 Jupiter LVI
 Jupiter LIX
 S/2003 J 4
 Pasiphae
 Hegemone
 Sinope
 Sponde
 Autonoe
 Megaclite
 S/2003 J 2

History of Jupiter 

History of Jupiter

Exploration of Jupiter 

Exploration of Jupiter

Flyby missions to explore Jupiter 

 Pioneer program
 Pioneer 10
 Pioneer 11
 Voyager program
 Voyager 1
 Voyager 2
 Ulysses
 Cassini–Huygens
 New Horizons

Direct missions to explore Jupiter 

 Galileo
 Juno

Proposed missions to explore Jupiter 

 EJSM/Laplace
 Jupiter Europa Orbiter
 Jupiter Ganymede Orbiter
 Jupiter Magnetospheric Orbiter
 Io Volcano Observer
 Colonization of Europa

Cancelled missions to explore Jupiter 

 Jupiter Icy Moons Orbiter
 Europa Orbiter
 Pioneer H

Exploration of Jupiter's moons 

 Exploration of Callisto
 Exploration of Europa
 Exploration of Ganymede
 Exploration of Io

Jupiter-related fiction 

 Jupiter in fiction
 Jupiter's moons in fiction
 Jovian–Plutonian gravitational effect
 Jupiter Effect

Jupiter-related organizations 

 NASA

Jupiter-related publications 

 Sidereus Nuncius

See also 

 Outline of astronomy
 Outline of the Solar System
 Outline of space exploration

References

External links 

 
 —A simulation of the 62 moons of Jupiter.
 
 
 
 
 
 June 2010 impact video
 
 
 Photographs of Jupiter circa 1920s from the Lick Observatory Records Digital Archive, UC Santa Cruz Library's Digital Collections

Jupiter
Jupiter